Kelvin Jones (born 10 February 1995) is a British-Zimbabwean singer-songwriter. Since 2016 he is living in Germany.

Background
His breakout single was "Call You Home" and became popular on Reddit after a friend posted it on the site. It was subsequently played on Good Morning America and led to Jones' signing by Sony under Four Music in Germany, Epic Records in England, and RCA in America. In 2015 he was the support tour for Mark Forster's Bauch und Kopf tour, and then followed that with a support tour of X Ambassadors in early 2016 and two months supporting James Morrison for his European tour Higher Than Here.

"Call You Home" has been used on ITV series Cold Feet. Kelvin is also featured in a 2017 Centurylink ad campaign which was shown during the Super Bowl.

Discography

Albums

Singles

References

External links

 Official website

1995 births
21st-century Zimbabwean male singers
Living people
21st-century British male singers